Magnus Maximus (died 8 August 388) was Roman emperor of the Western Roman Empire from 383 to 388. He usurped the throne from emperor Gratian.

He was made emperor in Britannia and Gaul the next year while Gratian's brother Valentinian II retained Italy, Pannonia, Hispania, and Africa. In 387, Maximus's ambitions led him to invade Italy, resulting in his defeat by Theodosius I at the Battle of Poetovio in 388. In the view of some historians, his death marked the end of direct imperial presence in Northern Gaul and Britain.

Life

Birth, army career
Maximus was born in Gallaecia, on the estates of Count Theodosius (the Elder) of the Theodosian dynasty, to whom he claimed to be related. Maximus was a distinguished general; he was probably a junior officer in Britain in 368, during the quelling of the Great Conspiracy. He served under Count Theodosius in Africa in 373. Assigned to Britain in 380, he defeated an incursion of the Picts and Scots in 381.

Rebellion and bid for the throne
The Western emperor Gratian had received a number of Alans into his bodyguard, and was accused of showing favouritism towards these Iranian speaking foreigners at the expense of Roman citizens. In 383 the discontented Roman army proclaimed Maximus emperor in Gratian's place.

Maximus went to Gaul to pursue his imperial ambitions, taking a large portion of the British garrison with him. After five days of skirmishing near Paris he defeated Gratian, who fled the battlefield and was killed at Lyon on 25 August 383. Continuing his campaign into Italy, Maximus was stopped from overthrowing Valentinian II, who was only twelve, when Bauto came with a powerful force to forestall him. Negotiations followed in 384, including the intervention of Ambrose, Bishop of Milan, leading to an accord with Valentinian II and Theodosius I in which Maximus was recognized as Augustus in the West.

Administration
Maximus made his capital at Augusta Treverorum (Treves, Trier) in Gaul, and ruled Britain, Gaul, Spain and Africa. He issued coinage and a number of edicts reorganising Gaul's system of provinces. Some historians believe Maximus may have founded the office of the Comes Britanniarum as well. He became a popular emperor; Quintus Aurelius Symmachus delivered a panegyric on Maximus's virtues. He used foederati forces such as the Alamanni to great effect.

Maximus was a stern persecutor of heretics. It was on his orders that Priscillian and six companions were executed for heresy, although the actual civil charges laid by Maximus were for the practice of magic. Prominent churchmen such as St. Ambrose and St. Martin of Tours protested against this involvement of the secular power in doctrinal matters, but the executions were carried out nonetheless. Maximus thereby not only established his credentials as an upholder of orthodoxy, but also strengthened his financial resources in the ensuing confiscations. The Gallic Chronicle of 452 describes the Priscillianists as "Manichaeans", a different Gnostic heresy already condemned in Roman law under Diocletian, and states that Magnus Maximus had them "caught and exterminated with the greatest zeal".

In a threatening latter addressed to Valentinian II, most likely composed between the spring of 384 and the summer of 387, Maximus complains of Valentinian's actions towards Ambrose and adherents of the Nicean Creed, writing: "Can it be that Your Serenity, venerable to me, thinks that a religion which has once taken root in the minds of men, which God himself has established, can be uprooted?" in response to "the disturbance and convulsion of Catholic law." 

Conversely, Maximus's edict of 387/388, which censured Christians at Rome for burning down a Jewish synagogue, was condemned by bishop Ambrose, who said people exclaimed, "the emperor has become a Jew".

Final conflicts and execution
In 387, Maximus managed to force emperor Valentinian II out of Milan. Valentinian fled to Theodosius I, and the two subsequently invaded from the east; their armies, led by Richomeres and other generals, campaigned against Maximus in July–August 388. Maximus was defeated in the Battle of Poetovio, and retreated to Aquileia. Meanwhile, the Franks under Marcomer had taken the opportunity to invade northern Gaul, at the same time further weakening Maximus's position.

Andragathius, magister equitum of Maximus and the killer of Emperor Gratian, was defeated near Siscia, while Maximus's brother, Marcellinus, fell in battle at Poetovio. Maximus surrendered in Aquileia, and although he pleaded for mercy was executed. The Senate passed a decree of Damnatio memoriae against him. However, his mother and at least two daughters were spared. Theodosius's trusted general Arbogast strangled Maximus's son, Victor, at Trier in the fall of the same year.

Fate of family

It is not recorded what happened to Maximus's family after his downfall. He is known to have had a wife, who is recorded as having sought spiritual counsel from St. Martin of Tours during his time at Trier. Her ultimate fate, and even her name (but see the Welsh tradition below), have not been preserved in definitive historic records. The same is true of Maximus's mother and daughters, other than that they were spared by Theodosius I.

One of Maximus's daughters may have been married to Ennodius, proconsul Africae (395). Ennodius's grandson was Petronius Maximus, another ill-fated emperor, who ruled in Rome for only 77 days before he was stoned to death while fleeing from the Vandals on 24 May 455. Other descendants of Ennodius, and thus possibly of Maximus, included Anicius Olybrius, emperor in 472, but also several consuls and bishops such as St. Magnus Felix Ennodius (Bishop of Pavia -21).  We also encounter an otherwise unrecorded daughter of Magnus Maximus, Sevira, on the Pillar of Eliseg (9th century), an early medieval inscribed stone in Wales which claims her marriage to Vortigern, king of the Britons.

Role in British and Breton history 
Maximus's bid for imperial power in 383 coincides with the last date for any evidence of a Roman military presence in Britain, the western Pennines, and the fortress of Deva. Coins dated later than 383 have been found in excavations along Hadrian's Wall, suggesting that troops were not entirely stripped from it, as was once thought. In the De Excidio et Conquestu Britanniae  written , Gildas says that Maximus "deprived" Britain not only of its Roman troops, but also of its "armed bands...governors and of the flower of her youth", never to return.

Having left with the troops and senior administrators, and planning to continue as the ruler of Britain in the future, his practical course was to transfer local authority to local rulers. Welsh legend supports that this happened, with stories such as Breuddwyd Macsen Wledig (English: The Dream of Emperor Maximus), where he not only marries a wondrous British woman (thus making British descendants probable), but also gives her father sovereignty over Britain (thus formally transferring authority from Rome back to the Britons themselves).

The earliest Welsh genealogies give Maximus (referred to as Macsen/Maxen Wledig, or Emperor Maximus) the role of founding father of the dynasties of several medieval Welsh kingdoms, including those of Powys and Gwent. He is given as the ancestor of a Welsh king on the Pillar of Eliseg, erected nearly 500 years after he left Britain, and he figures in lists of the Fifteen Tribes of Wales.

After he became emperor of the West, Maximus returned to Britain to campaign against the Picts and Scots (i.e., Irish), probably in support of Rome's long-standing allies the Damnonii, Votadini, and Novantae (all located in modern Scotland). While there he likely made similar arrangements for a formal transfer of authority to local chiefs—the later rulers of Galloway, home to the Novantae, claimed Maximus as the founder of their line, the same as did the Welsh kings.

The ninth century Historia Brittonum gives another account of Maximus and assigns him an important role:

Modern historians believe that this idea of mass British troop settlement in Brittany by Maximus may very well reflect some reality, as it accords with archaeological and other historical evidence and later Breton traditions.

Armorica declared independence from the Roman Empire in 407 CE, but contributed archers for Aetius's defence against Attila the Hun, and its king Riothamus was subsequently mentioned in contemporary documents as an ally of Rome's against the Goths. Despite its continued usage of two distinct languages, Breton and Gallo, and extensive invasions and conquests by Franks and Vikings, Armorica retained considerable cultural cohesion into the 13th century.

Maximus also established a military base in his native Gallaecia, i.e., Galicia (Spain), which persisted as a cultural entity despite occupation by the Suebi in 409, see Kingdom of Galicia.

Aetius sent large numbers of Alans to both Armorica and Galicia following the defeat of Attila at the Battle of the Catalunian Plains. The Alans evidently assimilated quickly into the local Celtic cultures, contributing their own legends, e.g., to the Arthurian Cycle of romances.

Welsh legend
Legendary versions of Maximus's career in which he marries the Welsh princess Elen may have circulated in popular tradition in Welsh-speaking areas from an early date. Although the story of Helen and Maximus's meeting is almost certainly fictional, there is some evidence for the basic claims. Welsh poetry also frequently refers to Macsen as a figure of comparison with later Welsh leaders. These legends come down to us in two separate versions.

Geoffrey of Monmouth 
 

According to Geoffrey of Monmouth's fictional Historia Regum Britanniae, the basis for many English and Welsh legends, Maximianus, as he calls him, was a Roman senator, a nephew of Coel Hen through Coel's brother Ioelinus, and king of the Britons following the death of Octavius (Eudaf Hen). Geoffrey writes this came about because Octavius wanted to wed his daughter to just such a powerful half-Roman-half-Briton and to give the kingship of Britain, as a dowry, to that husband, so he sent a message to Rome offering his daughter to Maximian.

Caradocus, the Duke of Cornwall, had suggested and supported the marriage between Octavius's daughter and Maximian. Maximian accepted the offer and left Rome for Britain. Geoffrey claims further that Maximian gathered an army as he sacked Frankish towns along the way. He invaded Clausentum (modern Southampton) unintentionally and nearly fought the army of the Britons under Conan Meriadoc before agreeing to a truce. Following further negotiations, Maximian was given the kingship of Britain and Octavius retired. Five years into his kingship, Magnus Maximus assembled a vast fleet and invaded Gaul, leaving Britain in the control of Caradocus. Upon reaching the kingdom of Armorica (historically, the region between the Loire and Seine rivers, later comprising Brittany, Normandy, Anjou, Maine and Touraine), he defeated the king and killed thousands of inhabitants. Before departing to Rome, he summoned Conanus, the rebellious nephew of Octavius, and asked him to rule as king of the land, which was renamed Brittany. Conan's men married native women after cutting out their tongues to preserve the purity of their language. Geoffrey of Monmouth presents this legend to explain the Welsh name for Brittany, Llydaw, as originating from lled-taw or "half-silent". Given that Conan was well established in genealogies as the founder of Brittany, this account is certainly connected to an older tradition than Geoffrey.

Following the death of Caradocus, rule of Britain as regent passed to Dionotus, who – facing a foreign invasion – appealed to Maximus, who finally sent a man named Gracianus Municeps with two legions to stop the attack. He killed many thousands before the invaders fled to Ireland. Maximus died in Rome soon after and Dionotus became the official king of the Britons. Unfortunately, before he could begin his reign, Gracianus took hold of the crown and made himself king over Dionotus.

While a broadly positive account of Maximian, the History concludes with the success of the barbarian invaders, and laments, "Alas for the absence of so many warlike soldiers through the madness of Maximianus!".

The Dream of Macsen Wledig

Although the Mabinogion tale The Dream of Macsen Wledig is written in later manuscripts than Geoffrey's version, the two accounts are so different that scholars agree the Dream cannot be based purely on Geoffrey's version. The Dream's account also seems to accord better with details in the Triads, so it perhaps reflects an earlier tradition.

Macsen Wledig, the Emperor of Rome, dreams one night of a lovely maiden in a wonderful, far-off land. Awakening, he sends his men all over the earth in search of her. With much difficulty they find her in a rich castle in Wales, daughter of a chieftain based at Segontium (Caernarfon), and lead the Emperor to her. Everything he finds is exactly as in his dream. The maiden, whose name is Helen or Elen, accepts and loves him. Because Elen is found a virgin, Macsen gives her father sovereignty over the island of Britain and orders three castles built for his bride.

In Macsen's absence, a new emperor seizes power and warns him not to return. With the help of men from Britain led by Elen's brother Conanus (Welsh: Cynan Meriadoc, Breton: Conan Meriadeg), Macsen marches across Gaul and Italy and recaptures Rome. In gratitude to his British allies, Macsen rewards them with a portion of Gaul that becomes known as Brittany.

His love Helen (Elen) was travelling along the Roman roads in a Snowdonian valley when she was given grievous news over her husband. Near a well she bent to her knees and cried "croes awr i mi yw hon" translated "a cross hour for me is this", and laid down and died. The village was named Croesor, a Snowdonian village nestled on the knees of the mountain Cnicht. This is why the village was called Croesor, and although it is close in a sense to Caernarfon, it is a fair way onto the valleys and mountains of Snowdonia. Croesor Primary School had the full fable drawn by the children in the 1970s in a pottery tile mural spanning the length of the small school; this was there from when it was made until the school was sold for private use.

Coel Hen
According to another legend, Maximus appointed Coel Hen, perhaps the legendary "Old King Cole", as governor of northern Britain, ruling from Eburacum (York). Following Maximus's departure for the continent, Coel became high king of northern Britain.

Other links with Caernarfon
Magnus Maximus and Elen are traditionally given as the parents of Saint Peblig (or Publicus, named in the Calendar of the Church in Wales), to whom a church dedicated stands in Caernarfon. The church is built on an important early Christian site, itself built on a Roman Mithraeum or temple of Mithras, close to the Segontium Roman Fort. A Roman altar was found in one of the walls during 19th century restoration work. The present church dates mainly from the 14th century.

The medieval English king Edward I was influenced by the legendary dream of Macsen Wledig/Magnus Maximus. In the dream Maximus had seen a fort, "the fairest that man ever saw", within a city at the mouth of a river in a mountainous country and opposite an island. Edward interpreted this to mean Segontium was the city of Maximus's dream and drew on the imperial link when building Caernarfon Castle in 1283.  It was apparently believed that Maximus died in Wales. According to the Flores Historiarum, during the construction of the Castle and the nearby planned town, the body believed to be of Magnus Maximus was discovered entombed; King Edward ordered its reburial in a local church.

Later literature
The prominent place of Macsen in history, Welsh legend and in the Matter of Britain means he is often a character or referred to in historical and Arthurian fiction. Such stories include Stephen R. Lawhead's Pendragon Cycle, Mary Stewart's The Hollow Hills, Jack Whyte's Camulod Chronicles, M J Trow's Britannia series, Nancy McKenzie's Queen of Camelot and Rudyard Kipling's Puck of Pook's Hill. The popular Welsh folk song Yma o Hyd, recorded by Dafydd Iwan in 1981, recalls Macsen Wledig and celebrates the continued survival of the Welsh people since his days.

Primary sources
He is mentioned in a number of ancient and medieval sources:

 Ammianus Marcellinus Rerum Gestarum Libri Qui Supersunt XXXI.4.9
 Geoffrey of Monmouth Histories of the Kings of Britain V.5-6
 Gildas De Excidio et Conquestu Britanniae II.13-14
 'Nennius' Historia Brittonum 27; 29
 Orosius Historium adversum paganos VII.34
 Pacatus Panegyricus Latini Pacati Deprani Dictus Theodosio
 Prosper (Tiro) of Aquitaine Chronicon 384; 388
 Socrates Scholasticus Historia Ecclesiastica  V.8; V.11
 Sozomen Historia Ecclesiastica  VII.13
 Sulpicius Severus Dialogi II.6;III.11,13
 Sulpicius Severus Historia Sacra II.49-51
 Sulpicius Severus Vita Sancti Martini XX
 Trioedd Ynys Prydein (The Welsh Triads)
 Zosimus Historia Nova

References

External links

 De Imperatoribus Romanis – Roman Emperors, account
 Roman Empire account
 Genèse de la Bretagne armoricaine

330s births
388 deaths
4th-century Christians
4th-century executions
4th-century Roman usurpers
4th-century murdered monarchs
4th-century Roman consuls
Ancient Romans in Britain
Arthurian characters
British traditional history
Executed Roman emperors
Executed Spanish people
Historical figures as candidates of King Arthur
Imperial Roman consuls
Mabinogion
People executed by the Roman Empire
Usurpers
Valentinianic dynasty
Roman emperors to suffer posthumous denigration or damnatio memoriae